Anatoly Yakovlevich Lepin (in Moscow – 24 October 1984, in Moscow) was a Soviet composer of Latvian origin.

He was born in 1907 into the family of Jēkabs Liepiņš, a Latvian instrument tuner, who had recently moved to Moscow. He graduated from the Moscow Conservatory in 1936, having studied composition with A. N. Aleksandrov, and went on to teach in Tashkent from 1936 to 1938 then in Kharkov from 1938 to 1939.

He lived in Riga from 1945 to 1950, and during that period composed the State Anthem of the Latvian SSR. 

Lepin was married to Milica Svarenieks, a ballerina of Latvian origin, with whom he had a son, Leonid (b. 1946), and a daughter – Tatyana (b. 1953). Lepin died in 1984 and was buried at the Vagankovo Cemetery in Moscow.

References

External links
 

1907 births
1984 deaths
Musicians from Moscow
People from Moskovsky Uyezd
Russian people of Latvian descent
Communist Party of the Soviet Union members
Soviet composers
Soviet male composers
20th-century classical musicians
Moscow Conservatory alumni
Burials at Vagankovo Cemetery
20th-century Russian male musicians